The 19th Naples Grand Prix was a motor race, run to Formula One rules, held on 14 May 1961 at Posillipo Circuit, Naples. The race was run over 60 laps of the circuit, and was won by Italian driver Giancarlo Baghetti in a Ferrari 156 in only his second Formula One race, having also won his first. Baghetti went on to win his next Formula One race as well, his first World Championship race, and is the only driver to have won his first three Formula One races run.

This race was held on the same day as the 1961 Monaco Grand Prix, therefore very few of the top drivers of the day were in action in Naples. Baghetti took a comfortable victory despite only starting third on the grid, with pole-sitter Gerry Ashmore finishing second after the other main challenger and early leader Roy Salvadori suffered a puncture. Lorenzo Bandini had led for a lap before Baghetti took over on lap 4, and he held the lead until the chequered flag.

Qualifying

Results

References

 "The Grand Prix Who's Who", Steve Small, 1995.
 "The Formula One Record Book", John Thompson, 1974, pp. 26–27.
 Race results at www.silhouet.com 

Naples Grand Prix
Grand Prix of Naples